Julianne Swartz (born April 29, 1967) is  a New York-based artist who works with sound, kinetics, and other materials to make sculpture, installations and photographs. Swartz uses optics, magnetism, and the concepts of space and time in her body of work.  Swartz uses lights, mirrors, magnets, periscopes, and the concepts of space and time in her body of work, which has been exhibited at the Brooklyn Museum of Art, MoMA PS1, New Museum, Indianapolis Museum of Art, and the 2004 Biennial exhibition at the Whitney Museum. Her awards include the Joan Mitchell Foundation Painters and Sculptors Award (2008) and the American Academy of Arts and Letters Academy Award in Art (2010).

Installation

Line Drawing
In Line Drawing (2003), Swartz created a flowing line drawing in front of and inside gallery walls using blue tape. She cut holes in the gallery wall, inviting viewers to follow the line through the inaccessible spaces with the help of hidden lights and mirrors.

Somewhere Harmony
In 2004, Swartz created Somewhere Harmony for the Whitney Museum of American Art in New York City. Utilizing the museum's six-story staircase, Swartz created a series of plexiglass pipes resembling exposed plumbing. The pipes, connected to speakers, carried unprofessional voices singing “Over the Rainbow” through floors of the staircase.

Digital Empathy
Digital Empathy, a 2011 public art installation, uses sound effects in the architectural features of the High Line, such as elevators and drinking fountains. When the user interacts with an object marked with an icon, a pre-recorded, message plays. The messages, spoken by computer-generated voices, range from false advertisements to motivational sayings.

How Deep Is Your
Swartz, known widely for her PVC installations that warp sound and sight, created How Deep is Your in 2003 at PS1/MOMA, Queens, NY. She revised the piece in 2012 at the DeCordova Museum and Sculpture Park in Lincoln, Massachusetts. Hundreds of feet of PVC pipe carried the faint recordings of "Love" by John Lennon and "How Deep Is Your Love" by the Bee Gees, throughout the museum. Intentional leak in the pipe let viewers listen along the route. The pipe line ends in a sound amplifying funnel which a viewer could insert his head and look into a mirror.

Sculpture

Surrogates
Surrogates is a set of three sculptures, made by Swartz in 2012. Surrogate (JS), Surrogate (KRL), and Surrogate (ARL) are carefully balanced stacks of concrete blocks, accompanied by a faint ticking noise from hundreds of clock motors within. Each compositions resembles a specific person; Swartz's husband, child, and Swartz herself.

Stability Studies
In Swartz's 2012 sculpture, Stability Study (table), she utilizes carefully balanced structures to seemingly defy gravity. The weight of a rock allows an unsteady, tall, table to stand on its own, despite having three legs. Other sculptures in the series utilize weight and precarious balancing.

External links
Julianne Swartz's home page
Work Archive
Julianne's feature at ArtBabble
Video of Digital Empathy (2011)

References

1967 births
Living people
American digital artists
Women digital artists
New media artists
American sound artists
Women sound artists
Jewish American artists
Jewish women artists
American installation artists
Artists from Phoenix, Arizona
Sculptors from New York (state)
University of Arizona alumni
American women sculptors
American women installation artists
Bard College faculty
Sculptors from Arizona
21st-century American women artists
American women academics
21st-century American Jews